Pedro Diaz (born November 26, 1962 in Santa Clara, Cuba) is a Cuban-American boxing trainer and entrepreneur. As an amateur boxing trainer, Diaz worked with the Cuban national team for four Olympic Games in 1992, 1996, 2000 and 2004. He also worked with the Dominican Republic for the Olympic Games in Beijing in 2008. As a professional boxing trainer, Diaz trains a stable of boxers and MMA fighters, including Roamer Alexis Angulo, Ivan Baranchyk, Xu Can, Miguel Cotto, Filip Hrgovic, Guillermo Rigondeaux, Tyrone Spong, and Vitor Belfort.

Early life and Cuba 
Before becoming a boxing trainer, Diaz trained under Alcides Sagarra and was an accomplished amateur boxer. He attended the Cuban Sports University specializing in boxing, and in 1999 he earned the title of Doctor in Pedagogical Sciences.

America and professional boxing 
In 2010 Diaz moved to the United States and continued training boxers and UFC fighters as well. Diaz trained boxers for notable fights such as Floyd Mayweather Jr. vs. Miguel Cotto, Nonito Donaire vs Guillermo Rigondeaux, Vasyl Lomachenko vs Guillermo Rigondeaux, which was the first time two dual Olympic gold medalist fought on a professional stage, and Jose Zepeda vs Ivan Baranchyk, which won the 2020 boxing fight of the year by CBS and USA Today Sports.

References 

1962 births
Living people
Cuban boxing trainers